A classic is something that is a perfect example of a particular style, something of lasting worth or with a timeless quality.

Classic or The Classic may also refer to:

Common uses
 Classics, study of culture of Ancient Greece and Ancient Rome

Film
 Classic (1998 film), a Russian film
 The Classic (2001 film), a Finnish film
 The Classic (2003 film), a South Korean film
 Classic (2016 film), a Nepali film

Music 
 Classical period

Albums
 Classic (Eric B. & Rakim album)
 The Classic (Joan as Police Woman album)
 Classic (Joe McElderry album), 2011
 Classic (Living Legends album), 2005
 Classic (Rah Digga album)
 The Classic (Shinhwa album)
 Classic (Terri Clark album), 2012
 Classic (Bryan Adams album), 2022

Extended plays
 Classic by Robyn Ottolini, 2020

Songs
 "Classic" (Adrian Gurvitz song), 1982
 "Classic" (The Knocks song), 2014
 "Classic" (MKTO song), 2013
 "Classic (Better Than I've Ever Been)", by Rakim, Kanye West, Nas, and KRS-One, 2007
 "Classic", by Dallas Smith, 2020
 "Classic", by Hieroglyphics from Full Circle, 2003

Sports

Golf
 Air Capital Classic
 AT&T Champions Classic
 Atlanta Classic
 Bob Hope Classic
 Byron Nelson Classic
 Chile Classic
 CIMB Classic
 Colombian Classic
 Dubai Desert Classic
 Greenbrier Classic
 Heritage Classic (golf)
 Honda Classic
 John Deere Classic
 Kia Classic
 Lexus Panama Classic
 Marathon Classic
 McGladrey Classic
 Meijer LPGA Classic
 OHL Classic at Mayakoba
 Pennsylvania Classic
 Personal Classic
 Portland Classic
 ShopRite LPGA Classic
 Southern Farm Bureau Classic
 St. Jude Classic
 Stonebrae Classic
 Thornberry Creek LPGA Classic
 Toto Japan Classic
 True Thailand Classic
 Volunteers of America LPGA North Dallas Classic
 Walt Disney World Golf Classic
 Zurich Classic of New Orleans

Tennis
 Birmingham Classic (tennis)
 Stanford Classic
 Thunderbird Classic (tennis)

Other sports
 Classic (snooker), a professional snooker tournament, 1980–1992

Other uses 
 Classic (novel), a novel in the It Girl series
 Classic 22, a Canadian sailboat design
 Classic (transit bus), a bus developed by GM
 Classic (cigarette), Indian cigarette brand
 BlackBerry Classic, a smartphone by BlackBerry Limited
 Classic Environment, the OS X environment for running pre-OS X Mac applications

See also 
 Classical (disambiguation)
 Classics (disambiguation)